Heinrich Porges (November 25, 1837 – November 17, 1900) was a Czech-Austrian  choirmaster, music critic and writer of Jewish descent.

Life
Heinrich Porges was born in Prague, the son of Simon Porges (1801–1869) and his wife Charlotte. He originally studied Philosophy and Law in Prague, later turning to music. In 1863 he became an assistant of the critic Franz Brendel in editing the Neue Zeitschrift für Musik in Leipzig. In 1867 he produced the arts pages of the Süddeutsche Presse in Muncih. He remained there as music critic of the Münchner Neueste Nachrichten from 1880.

Porges became a devotee and intimate of Richard Wagner despite Wagner's antisemitism, and his extensive notes on Wagner's rehearsal and staging were published in the journal Bayreuther Blätter over the period 1880-1896. His study of Tristan und Isolde was published after his death in 1906 by Hans von Wolzogen. He received a life pension from King Ludwig II of Bavaria.

in 1886 he formed the 'Porges Choir' to promote the music of his favoured composers including Hector Berlioz and Anton Bruckner.

Porges married Wilhelmine Merores; the writer Elsa Bernstein was their daughter. His death in 1900 occurred during a rehearsal of Franz Liszt's oratorio, Christus, at Munich.

Notes

Sources 
 Austrian Music Dictionary online (in German)
 Porges website

19th-century Czech people
Czech conductors (music)
Male conductors (music)
Czech Jews
Czech music critics
Musicians from Prague
Richard Wagner
1837 births
1900 deaths
19th-century journalists
Czech journalists
Male journalists
19th-century composers
19th-century conductors (music)
19th-century German musicians
19th-century Czech male musicians